Three Rivers Village School is the first democratic school in Pittsburgh, PA.  It operates on the Sudbury school model of democratic education.  Three Rivers Village School opened in the Fall of 2013 and accepts students from Kindergarten through twelfth grade.  It is a tuition-based private school that offers a sliding scale tuition rate. As of Fall 2014, it enrolls around 25 students.

Three Rivers Village School emphasizes personal responsibility, innate thoughtfulness and trust in the judgement of its students and strives to foster a community of equals governed by democratic values, instead of the hierarchy, standardized testing, and arbitrary rule following enforced in the traditional schooling model.

Curriculum

The students at Three Rivers Village School are free to spend their time during each school day in whatever way they wish, as long as they adhere to the rules defined by the School Meeting.  Resources available to the students include books, computers, musical instruments, a kitchen, art supplies, toys, outdoor space, off-site field trips, as well as the knowledge and experience of staff and other students.  Every member of the school, staff and students alike, has an equal voice at the weekly School Meeting, where the day-to-day operations of the school are determined.

School rules, created by the School Meeting, are compiled into a rule book that is enforced by the Justice Committee.  Every member of the school participates in Justice Committee, which is a daily meeting of students and staff. All decisions about rule making, discipline, suspensions, expulsions, etc. are made democratically, with each member of the school having an equal vote.

History

Three Rivers Village School opened in fall of 2013 at 4721 Stanton Avenue, Pittsburgh, PA, in the city's Stanton Heights neighborhood. The school was founded by a group of parents and teachers including Evan Mallory and Jean Marie Pearce.
After two years of operation, the school moved in 2015 from its original Stanton Heights location to the former St. Stephen's School building at 134 East Elizabeth Street, Pittsburgh, PA in the Hazelwood section of the city.

See also

List of democratic schools
Democratic education
Education reform

External links
 Official Website
 Sudbury Valley School Official Website

References

2013 establishments in Pennsylvania
Educational institutions established in 2013
High schools in Pittsburgh
Middle schools in Pittsburgh
Private elementary schools in Pennsylvania
Private high schools in Pennsylvania
Private middle schools in Pennsylvania
Sudbury Schools